Loretta Irene Bayliss (1939 – 30 June 1966) was a New Zealand cricketer who played as a left-arm fast-medium bowler. She appeared in one Test match for New Zealand in 1961. Playing against Australia, she took 5/28 in the final innings of the match to become the 6th player to take a five-wicket haul on their Women's Test debut. She played domestic cricket for Canterbury.

References

External links
 
 

1939 births
1966 deaths
Cricketers from Christchurch
New Zealand women cricketers
New Zealand women Test cricketers
Date of birth missing
Canterbury Magicians cricketers